Product life-cycle management (PLM) is the succession of strategies by business management as a product goes through its life-cycle. The conditions in which a product is sold (advertising, saturation) changes over time and must be managed as it moves through its succession of stages.

Goals
The goals of product life cycle management (PLM) are to reduce time to market, improve product quality, reduce prototyping costs, identify potential sales opportunities and revenue contributions, maintain and sustain operational serviceability, and reduce environmental impacts at end-of-life. To create successful new products the company must understand its customers, markets and competitors. Product Lifecycle Management (PLM) integrates people, data, processes and business systems. It provides product information for companies and their extended supply chain enterprise. PLM solutions help organizations overcome the increased complexity and engineering challenges of developing new products for the global competitive markets.

Product life cycle
The concept of product life cycle (PLC) concerns the life of a product in the market with respect to business/commercial costs and sales measures. The product life cycle proceeds through multiple phases, involves many professional disciplines, and requires many skills, tools and processes. PLC management makes the following three assumptions:
 Products have a limited life and thus every product has a life cycle.
 Product sales pass through distinct stages, each posing different challenges, opportunities, and problems to the seller.
 Products require different marketing, financing, manufacturing, purchasing, and human resource strategies in each life cycle stage.
Once the product is designed and put into the market, the offering should be managed efficiently for the buyers to get value from it. Before entering into any market complete analysis is carried out by the industry for both external and internal factors including the laws and regulations, environment, economics, cultural values and market needs. From the business perspective, as a good business, the product needs to be sold before it finishes its life. In terms of profitability, expiry may jolt the overall profitability of the business therefore there are few strategies, which are practiced to ensure that the product is sold within the defined period of maturity.

Extending the product life cycle

Extending the product life cycle by improving sales, can be done through

 Advertising: Its purpose is to get additional audience and potential customers.
 Exploring and expanding to new markets: By conducting market research and offering the product (or some adapted form of it) to new markets, it is possible to get more customers.
 Price reduction: Many customers are attracted by price cuts and discount tags.
 Adding new features: Adding value to the product to enhance its usability or to attract the attention of a wider customer base.
 Packaging: New, attractive, useful or eco-friendly packaging influence the target customers.
 Changing customer consumption habits: Promoting new trends of consumption can increase the number of customers.
 Special promotions: Raising interest by offering Jackpot and other offers.
 Heightening interest: Many of the following things attract many customers who match certain profiles: Eco-friendly production processes, good work conditions, funding the efforts of non-profit organizations (cancer cure, anti-war efforts, refugees, GLTBI, environment and animal protection, etc.) and the like.

Something important to notice is that all these techniques rely on advertising to become known. Advertising needs the others to target other potential customers and not the same over and over again.

Characteristics of PLC stages
There are the following major product life cycle stages:

Identifying PLC stages
Identifying the stage of a product is an art more than a science, but it's possible to find patterns in some of the general product features at each stage. Identifying product stages when the product is in transition is very difficult. More recently, it has been shown that user-generated contents (UGC) (e.g., in the form of online product reviews) has the potential to reveal buyer personality characteristics that can in turn be used to identify product life cycle stage.

{| class="wikitable"
|-
| rowspan="2" style="vertical-align: bottom;text-align: center;"| Identifyingfeatures
| colspan="4" style="text-align: center;" | Stages
|-
! Introduction !! Growth !! Maturity !! Decline
|-
| Sales     || Low || High || High || Low
|-
| Investment cost || Very high || High (lower than intro stage) || Low || Low
|-
| Competition || Low or no competition || High || Very high || Very High
|-| Low
|-
| Profit || Low || High || High || Low
|}

See also

 Application lifecycle management
 Brand awareness
 Consumer behaviour
 Diminishing manufacturing sources and material shortages (DMSMS)
 Material selection
 New product development
 Obsolescence
 Open Innovation
 Planned obsolescence
 Product lifecycle management
 Product management
 Product teardown
 Software product management
 Technology life cycle
 Toolkits for user innovation

References

Further reading
 Box, Jonathan Mbosia,  Extending product lifetime: Prospects and opportunities, Tanzanian Journal of Marketing September, 1983
 Day, G. "The product life cycle: Analysis and applications issues", Journal of Marketing, vol 45, Autumn 1981, pp 60–67.
 Levitt, T., "Exploit the product life cycle", Harvard Business Review, vol 43, November–December 1965, pp 81–94.
 Dhalla, N.K., Yuspeh, S., "Forget the product life cycle concept", Harvard Business Review, Jan–Feb 1976
 
 
 
 
 
 Levitt, T., 1965. Exploit the Product Life Cycle. Harvard Business Review
 

Brand management
Business terms
Marketing strategy
Product management